Nick Lee is an Irish actor. His work on screen includes Reign (The CW); The Fall (BBC); Jack Taylor (TV3/RTL); Raw (RTÉ); Single-Handed: The Stolen Child (RTÉ); as Michael Collins in Frongoch - University of Revolution (TG4/S4C); The Clinic (RTÉ); Battlefield Britain (BBC); and the final series of Bachelors Walk (RTÉ).
His stage work includes: The Changeling (Young Vic, London); Dubliners (Dublin Theatre Festival); Juno and the Paycock directed by Howard Davies (Abbey Theatre/National Theatre, London); Pineapple by Philip McMahon (Calipo); Malachy in The Dead School by Pat McCabe (Tricycle Theatre, London); The Passing written and directed by Paul Mercier and Three Sisters directed by David Leveaux (Abbey Theatre Dublin); Dmitry Karamazov in Delirium by Enda Walsh; Shawn Keogh in The Playboy of the Western World directed by Tony award winning director Garry Hynes (Druid/Tokyo International Arts Festival/Perth International Arts Festival, Australia);  DruidSynge- The Complete Plays of JM Synge directed by Garry Hynes (Galway, Dublin, Edinburgh, Inis Meain, Guthrie Theater Minneapolis & at the Lincoln Center Festival in New York City); The Year of the Hiker directed by Garry Hynes (Druid/Irish Tour); as Michael Hegarty in The Freedom of the City by Brian Friel (Finborough Theatre, London); as Patrick Kavanagh in The Green Fool (Upstate Theatre Project)

External links 

 

Irish male stage actors
Living people
Irish male television actors
Place of birth missing (living people)
Year of birth missing (living people)